James Rogers Miller Jr. (June 15, 1931 – June 25, 2014) was a United States district judge of the United States District Court for the District of Maryland.

Education and career

Born in Sandy Spring, Maryland, Miller received a Bachelor of Arts degree from Wesleyan University in 1953 and a Bachelor of Laws from Georgetown University Law Center in 1955. He was in private practice in Rockville, Maryland from 1955 to 1970. He was a member of the Maryland House of Delegates from 1963 to 1967 and a member of the Republican Party.

Federal judicial service

On September 28, 1970, Miller was nominated by President Richard Nixon to a new seat on the United States District Court for the District of Maryland created by 84 Stat. 294. He was confirmed by the United States Senate on October 13, 1970, and received his commission on October 15, 1970. Miller served in that capacity until his resignation on December 1, 1986.

Post judicial career and death

After his resignation from the federal bench, Miller returned to the private practice of law, including service as an arbitrator and mediator. Miller died of congestive heart failure on June 25, 2014 in Easton, Maryland.

References

Sources
 

1931 births
2014 deaths
People from Sandy Spring, Maryland
Wesleyan University alumni
Georgetown University Law Center alumni
Judges of the United States District Court for the District of Maryland
United States district court judges appointed by Richard Nixon
20th-century American judges
Republican Party members of the Maryland House of Delegates